Istočni Drvar is a municipality located in western Republika Srpska, an entity of Bosnia and Herzegovina. it is situated in the central part of the Bosanska Krajina region. The seat of the municipality is in the village of Potoci.

History
In 1995, following the end of the Bosnian War, Istočni Drvar was created from part of the pre-war municipality of Drvar (the other part of the pre-war municipality is now in the Federation of Bosnia and Herzegovina). During the war, it was also known as Srpski Drvar (Српски Дрвар).

As of 2019, it is the smallest municipality by number of inhabitants in Republika Srpska and the whole of Bosnia and Herzegovina.

Geography
It is located in a densely wooded area between municipalities of Petrovac in the north-west, Ribnik in the east, and Drvar in the south.

Demographics

Population

Ethnic composition

See also
 Municipalities of Republika Srpska

References

External links 

 Municipalities of Republika Srpska

Municipalities of Republika Srpska